Bahía Ballenas Airstrip  is a dirt airstrip located in Campo René, Municipality of Mulegé, Baja California Sur, Mexico,

Campo René is a camp located on the Ballenas Bay (Bahía Ballenas), on the Pacific Ocean coast, just on the entrance of Estero "El Coyote", to the East of Punta Abreojos.

The airstrip is used solely for general aviation purposes. The BBS code is used as identifier. The airstrip is operated by "Campo René Cabañas", telephone numbers 7-00-72 and fax 7-04-77.

External links
 Baja Bush Pilots Forum about BBS.
Photo.
Estero El Coyote Photo.

Airports in Baja California Sur
Mulegé Municipality